Joseph Bryan Hehir (born 1940) is an American Catholic priest, philosopher, and theologian in the United States. He was awarded a MacArthur Fellowship in 1984.

Career
Hehir serves as the Secretary of Health and Social Services for the Archdiocese of Boston. He was also the Parker Gilbert Montgomery Professor of the Practice of Religion and Public Life at Harvard University's John F. Kennedy School of Government until his retirement in 2021. 

Hehir was formerly a faculty member at Georgetown University and at the Harvard Divinity School.

Hehir was elected to the American Academy of Arts and Sciences in 1995. He became a member of the American Philosophical Society in 2002.

In 2004, he was awarded the Laetare Medal by the University of Notre Dame, the oldest and most prestigious award for American Catholics.

References

1940 births
20th-century American Roman Catholic priests
Georgetown University faculty
Harvard University alumni
Harvard Kennedy School faculty
Living people
MacArthur Fellows
Laetare Medal recipients
Chelmsford High School alumni
Harvard Divinity School faculty
21st-century American Roman Catholic priests
Members of the American Philosophical Society